Katha may refer to:

Films
 Katha (1983 film), an Indian romantic comedy 
 Katha (2009 film), an Indian Telugu thriller

Places in Myanmar
 Katha District, a district in Sagaing Region
 Katha Township, a township in Katha District
 Katha, Myanmar, a town in the township and administrative center of the district

Other uses
 Katha (storytelling format), an Indian style of religious storytelling
 Katha (unit), a unit of measurement, largely obsolete in India and Bangladesh but still used in Nepal
 Katha (moth), a genus of tiger moths
 Catechu, an extract of acacia, called katha in Hindi
 Katha (NGO), a non-profit and non-governmental organisation based in Delhi
 Katha Books, a publishing house owned by Katha NGO
 Katha Pollitt (born 1949), American feminist writer

See also
 Catha (disambiguation)
 Kata (disambiguation)
 Katta (disambiguation)
 Khata, a Tibetan ceremonial scarf